Kokaj (/Kokaj-Inatoc) is a village in the Gjilan district of Kosovo.

Climate
The average temperature is -2 °C. Spring and autumn are cool and rainy, and the summer is hot and dry - with the average temperature + 22 °C. The high temperatures in Kosovo during the year are between 25 °C and + 38 °C. The average annual temperature is 10.6 degrees Celsius Anamorava. The annual rainfall are large, averaging 550 mm. In Lugina e Anamoraves Binçes are smaller than in higher areas in the slopes of the Karadag Mountains.

Demography

Notable residents 
Daut Dauti, Kosovan journalist
Nijazi Ramadani, Kosovan author poet

Gallery

Notes

References

External links

 Kokaj, Albania page
 Kokaj.net 
 Kokajt që nga lashtësia 

Villages in Gjilan